The Northern Economic Region, (
tr.: Severny Ekonomichesky Rayon), is one of twelve economic regions of Russia.

Composition
Arkhangelsk Oblast
Republic of Karelia
Komi Republic
Murmansk Oblast
Nenets Autonomous Okrug
Vologda Oblast
All are in the Northwestern Federal District

Socio-economic indicators
The Northern Economic Region accounted for almost 4% of the national GRP in 2008. In the partly arctic zone of Russia, monthly wages appear much higher than the national average, but this is offset by the likelihood of payment being much lower. A higher proportion in the region are employed in a state enterprise, and a lower proportion are secure in their jobs. Unemployment is more than one fifth higher in the region than across Russia as a whole.

Although climatic conditions can be daunting, the life expectancy in the Northern region is almost exactly the national average for both men and women. Youths ambitious for a higher education tend to leave the region; the ratio of students to population is a fifth lower than the national average. And, for those who live in the region, the expectation of life improving is lower than the national average.

References

Economic regions of Russia